Jenő Pap (born 15 December 1951) is a Hungarian fencer. He competed in the team foil and épée events at the 1980 Summer Olympics.

He was named Hungarian Sportsman of the year in 1982 for winning the individual épée event at that year's World Fencing Championships.

References

External links
 

1951 births
Living people
Hungarian male épée fencers
Olympic fencers of Hungary
Fencers at the 1980 Summer Olympics
Martial artists from Budapest
Hungarian male foil fencers
20th-century Hungarian people
21st-century Hungarian people